Texas Tech University Health Sciences Center at Abilene (TTUHSC Abilene) is a branch campus of Texas Tech University Health Sciences Center (TTUHSC) located in Abilene, Texas. The campus has a school of pharmacy and a school of nursing.

The School of Pharmacy  opened on August 12, 2007. Classes are held in a Spanish-themed  building, constructed at a cost of US$15.5 million. The initial enrollment of 40 grew to 160 by fall of 2011. As of 2012, the school had  19 faculty members. The Julia Jones Matthews Department of Public Health is based out of the TTUHSC Abilene campus.

References

External links
 

Abilene
Buildings and structures in Abilene, Texas
Universities and colleges in Abilene, Texas